The Zero Hour is a 2010 Venezuelan action film directed by Diego Velasco that takes place during a medical strike in Venezuela.

Synopsis 
In Caracas in 1996, a medical strike takes place. Parca (Zapata 666), a self-described Grim reaper and regular sicario, brings a pregnant injured woman (Amanda Key) to his gang; the locals are unsympathetic to the doctors' reasons for strike and kidnap a doctor (Erich Wildpret) from the picket line, but the child is born in the back of a car. Witnessing this, Parca becomes invested in helping the needy, holding-up a private hospital and taking hostages to release in return for treatment of those from the slums. Eventually, this violent scheme collapses on him and the people around him.

Production 
The production mimicked the story of the film, facing troubles involving the kidnap of three crew members, including its co-producer, director Velasco being held-up at gunpoint, and the assassination of an actor shortly before recording his parts. Despite the themes, a co-writer said that they "want viewers to digest and interpret the movie’s ideas, not to put ideas in their heads".

By 2016, it was the highest-grossing Venezuelan national film, getting $3.5 million in box office takings in Venezuela.

Reception 
The film was well-received in the Americas, both North and South. It was given as an example in the book The Precarious in the Cinemas of the Americas of a "socially-engaged thriller [...] that [makes] use of mainstream cinema techniques, such as MTV-style, fast-paced editing and the inclusion of violent scenes to call attention to the collective responsibility for social inequalities".

Cast 
 Zapata 666 - Parca
 Amanda Key - Lady Di (after Diana, Princess of Wales, but pronounced "Lady Dee")
 Erich Wildpret - Dr. Ricardo Cova
 Laureano Olivares - Buitre
 Marisa Román - Veronica Rojas 
 Albi De Abreu - Jesus

Awards 
The film won three international awards, "Best Action Sequence Martial Arts Feature" at the US Action On Film International Film Festival (2011); the Audience Choice award at the Jackson Crossroads Film Festival (2011); and the Best Film at the Los Angeles Latino International Film Festival (2011). It was also nominated for the Best Latin-American Film award at the Mexican Ariel Awards in 2012.

References

External links 
 
 
 

2010 action films
2010 films
Venezuelan action films
2010s Spanish-language films